The  is a strait separating the Japanese islands of Kyushu and Shikoku. It connects the Pacific Ocean and the Seto Inland Sea on the western end of Shikoku. The narrowest part of this channel is the Hōyo Strait.

In the English-speaking world, the Bungo Strait is most known as a setting in the 1958 World War II submarine film Run Silent, Run Deep, based upon the best-selling 1955 novel by then-Commander Edward L. Beach Jr.

Notes

References
 Leeman, Sergio and Robert Wise. (1995). Robert Wise on his Films: from Editing Room to Director's Chair. Los Angeles: Silman-James. ;  OCLC 243829638
 Nussbaum, Louis-Frédéric and Käthe Roth. (2005).  Japan encyclopedia. Cambridge: Harvard University Press. ;  OCLC 58053128
 Sheffield, Richard. (2009). Subs on the Hunt: 40 of the Greatest WWII Submarine War Patrols. Atlanta: Fox Publishing. ;  OCLC 652102659

Straits of Japan
Landforms of Ehime Prefecture
Landforms of Ōita Prefecture